Sabine Christiansen (born 20 September 1957 in Preetz, Schleswig-Holstein, West Germany) is a German journalist and television presenter.

Career 
After finishing school in Preetz, Christiansen worked at Lufthansa from 1976 to 1982, then apprenticed in journalism at the Norddeutscher Rundfunk in Hamburg until 1985. She ultimately became a regular presenter for the ARD's national TV news journal Tagesthemen, in rotation with Hanns Joachim Friedrichs (1987–1991) and Ulrich Wickert (1991–2004).

Upon leaving Tagesthemen in January 1998, Christiansen hosted her own eponymous talk show, Sabine Christiansen, which aired on Das Erste until 2007. Along with prominent German political and celebrity guests, Christiansen interviewed international political and business leaders including Bill Gates (1999, 2002), James Baker (2000), Enrique Barón Crespo (2000), Wolfgang Schüssel (2000), Tony Blair (2002), Jean-Claude Juncker (2003), Hillary Clinton (2003), Donald H. Rumsfeld (2003), Bill Clinton (2004), Kofi Annan (2004) and Condoleezza Rice (2004). In 2006, she visited President George W. Bush for an interview at the White House in Washington D.C.; it was the longest interview Bush gave to a foreign TV station
during his presidency.

In addition, Christiansen moderated the TV election debates between Chancellor Gerhard Schröder and his challengers Edmund Stoiber (2002) and Angela Merkel (2005).

From 2006 until 2008, Christiansen hosted the 12-part series "Global Players with Sabine Christiansen", which aired around the world on CNBC. Donald H. Rumsfeld was the first guest of the show on 5 February 2006.

Activism 
,Christiansen has been a UNICEF Goodwill Ambassador for Germany since 1997. In 2015 she signed an open letter which the ONE Campaign had been collecting signatures for; the letter was addressed to Angela Merkel and Nkosazana Dlamini-Zuma, urging them to focus on women as they served as the head of the G7 in Germany and the African Union in South Africa respectively, which will start to set the priorities in development funding before a main UN summit in September 2015 that will establish new development goals for the generation.

Other activities

Corporate boards
 MAGNA Real Estate, Member of the Advisory Board (since 2021)
 Arqueonautas GmbH (ARQ), Member of the Advisory Board (since 2012)
 Freenet AG, Member of the Supervisory Board (since 2012)
 Hermes Europe GmbH, Member of the Supervisory Board (since 2013)

Non-profit organizations
 Hertha BSC Foundation, Chairwoman of the Board of Trustees (since 2009)
 Laureus Sport for Good Foundation Germany/Austria, Deputy Chairwoman (since 2012)
 UNICEF National Committee of Germany, Member

Personal life 
On 30 June 2008 Christiansen married Norbert Medus.

Awards 
 1990: Goldene Kamera, Bambi
 1992: Bayerischer Fernsehpreis
 1995: Adolf Grimme Award
 1996: Goldener Löwe
 2001: Bambi, Courage Award
 2002: Order of Merit of the Federal Republic of Germany, Legion of Honour, Deutscher Fernsehpreis
 2005: Women's World Award

References

External links

Website by company of Sabine Christiansen
Jens König: H.-U. Jörges and „Christiansen“: Stimmungsmacher der Hartz-Republik, taz, 31 May 2006
LobbyControl: Sabine Christiansen – Schaubühne der Einflussreichen und Meinungsmacher, 7 September 2006
Frankfurter Allgemeine Sonntagszeitung – Wie eine Unpolitische Politik machte. 10 February 2007
Sabine Christiansens Abschied. Spiegel Online, 24 June 2007

German television talk show hosts
German television reporters and correspondents
German television presenters
German broadcast news analysts
Recipients of the Cross of the Order of Merit of the Federal Republic of Germany
1957 births
Living people
Chevaliers of the Légion d'honneur
Flight attendants
Lufthansa people
German women television presenters
German women television journalists
20th-century German journalists
21st-century German journalists
ARD (broadcaster) people
Norddeutscher Rundfunk people
20th-century German women
21st-century German women